Murder Tomorrow is a 1938 British crime film directed by Donovan Pedelty and starring Gwenllian Gill, Jack Livesey and Molly Hamley-Clifford. It was made at Cricklewood Studios as a quota quickie for release by Paramount Pictures.

Cast
 Gwenllian Gill as Jean Andrews  
 Jack Livesey as Peter Wilton  
 Molly Hamley-Clifford as Miss Fitch  
 Rani Waller as Miss Canning  
 Francis Roberts as Sergeant Enfield  
 Raymond Lovell as Inspector Travers  
 Jonathan Field as PC Sanders

References

Bibliography
 Chibnall, Steve. Quota Quickies: The Birth of the British 'B' Film. British Film Institute, 2007.
 Low, Rachael. Filmmaking in 1930s Britain. George Allen & Unwin, 1985.
 Wood, Linda. British Films, 1927-1939. British Film Institute, 1986.

External links

1938 films
British crime films
1938 crime films
Films directed by Donovan Pedelty
Quota quickies
Films shot at Cricklewood Studios
British black-and-white films
1930s English-language films
1930s British films